Sheffield–Chapin Community School District was a school district headquartered in Sheffield, Iowa, serving Sheffield and Chapin.

History
It formed in 1960 as the result of the merger between the Sheffield Community School District and the Chapin Community School District. In fall 1988 the district began a whole-grade sharing agreement, in which students from one school district attend another district's schools for certain levels, with the Meservey–Thornton Community School District. At that point the Sheffield building hosted the senior high school (grades 9–12) while Thornton building housed the middle school (grades 5–8). These two districts together entered into a whole grade-sharing agreement with the Rockwell–Swaledale Community School District at the high school level in 2004; the Rockwell–Swaledale and Sheffield–Chapin–Meservey–Thornton high schools at the time remained separate but shared students and programs.

On July 1, 2007, Sheffield–Chapin and Meservey–Thornton legally merged into the Sheffield–Chapin–Meservey–Thornton (SCMT) Community School District.

References

External links
  (grade-sharing agreement website involving Sheffield–Chapin and Meservey–Thornton, and that of the unified SCMT post-2007)

Defunct school districts in Iowa
Education in Franklin County, Iowa
1960 establishments in Iowa
School districts established in 1960
2007 disestablishments in Iowa
School districts disestablished in 2007